Nothrotheriidae is a family of extinct ground sloths that lived from approximately 17.5 mya—10,000 years ago, existing for approximately . Previously placed within the tribe Nothrotheriini or subfamily Nothrotheriinae within Megatheriidae, they are now usually placed in their own family, Nothrotheriidae. Nothrotheriids appeared in the Burdigalian, some 19.8 million years ago, in South America. While nothrotheriids were small compared to some of their megatheriid relatives, their claws provided an effective defense against predators, like those of larger anteaters today.

Evolution 
During the late Miocene and Pliocene, the sloth genus Thalassocnus of the west coast of South America became adapted to a shallow-water marine lifestyle. However, the family placement of Thalassocnus has been disputed; while long considered a nothrotheriid, one recent analysis moves it to Megatheriidae, while another retains it in a basal position within Nothrotheriidae.

The only known nothrotheriid in North America was Nothrotheriops, which appeared at the beginning of the Pleistocene, about 2.6 Ma ago. Nothrotherium reached Mexico (Nuevo Leon) by the late Pleistocene.

The last ground sloths in North America belonging to Nothrotheriidae, the Shasta ground sloth (Nothrotheriops shastensis), died so recently that their dried subfossilized dung has remained undisturbed in some cavessuch as the Rampart Cave, located on the Arizona side of the Lake Mead National Recreation Area as if it were just recently deposited. A Shasta ground sloth skeleton, found in a lava tube at Aden Crater in New Mexico, still had skin and hair preserved, and is now at the Yale Peabody Museum. The largest samples of Nothrotheriops dung can be found in the collections of the National Museum of Natural History.

Phylogeny 
The following sloth family phylogenetic tree is based on collagen and mitochondrial DNA sequence data (see Fig. 4 of Presslee et al., 2019).

Here is a more detailed phylogeny of the Nothrotheriidae based on Varela et al. 2018.

References

External links 

 
Prehistoric mammal families
 
 
 
Burdigalian first appearances
Holocene extinctions
Neogene mammals of South America
Quaternary mammals of South America
Quaternary mammals of North America
Taxa named by Florentino Ameghino